Front Beyond the Front Line is a 1977 Soviet war film directed by Igor Gostev.

The film is the second part in a trilogy directed by Igor Gostev about partisan resistance against the Nazi occupation of the Soviet Union during WWII. The first part is Front Without Flanks (1975). The third part is Front in the Rear of the Enemy (1981). All three screenplays were written by KGB Officer Semyon Tsvigun.

Vyacheslav Tikhonov starred as Soviet Army Officer Mlynsky, the commander of the partisan group in all three films.

Plot 
Winter, 1943-1944. The war is stretching into its third year. Major Mlynsky, the commander of a partisan group is promoted to Lt. Colonel. Meanwhile the Germans are working on a super weapon and have created a fake partisan detachment. Inevitably the two detachments clash.

Cast 
 Vyacheslav Tikhonov as Colonel Mlynsky
 Ivan Lapikov as Yerofeich
 Galina Polskikh as Nurse Zina
 Valeriya Zaklunnaya as Irina Petrovna
 Oleg Zhakov as Matvey
 Yevgeniy Matveev
 Igor Ledogorov as Andrei Afanasyev-Raysner
 Georgiy Nikolaenko as Lieutenant Gorshkov
 Evgeniy Shutov
 Ivan Pereverzev as Father Pavel

References

External links 
 

1977 films
1970s Russian-language films
Soviet war films
Soviet World War II films
Russian World War II films